Mariam Kvrivishvili (born 11 June 1990 in Tbilisi) is a Georgian politician. 

In November 2020 Mariam was elected a member of Parliament of Georgia by party list, block: "Georgian Dream". She is Member of Political Bureau of the Ruling party. Currently, she holds the position of Deputy Minister of Ministry of Economy and Sustainable Development of Georgia. 
Mariam Kvrivishvili joined the Government of Georgia in early 2019 as head of Georgian National Tourism Administration.

References

External links
Parliament of Georgia

1990 births
Living people
Politicians from Tbilisi
21st-century politicians from Georgia (country)